Philémon De Meersman (15 November 1914 in Sint-Agatha-Berchem – 2 April 2005 in Dilbeek) was a Belgian cyclist.

Palmares
1936
1st La Flèche Wallonne
1939
1st Stage 7 Tour du Nord

References

1914 births
2005 deaths
Belgian male cyclists
People from Sint-Agatha-Berchem
Cyclists from Brussels